The Shanghai Stadium is a multi-purpose stadium in Shanghai, China. Between 2009 and 2019, the stadium hosted home matches of the Chinese Super League team Shanghai SIPG.

History
The stadium opened on 14 March 1999 when the eighth National Games of China were held in Shanghai. It was used for football preliminaries at the 2008 Summer Olympics. Shanghai Stadium was also the venue for the opening ceremony of the 2007 Special Olympics World Summer Games. The stadium hosted the 2015 Supercoppa Italiana match between Juventus and Lazio on 8 August 2015.

See also

Venues of the 2008 Summer Olympics

References

External links

Shanghai Stadium – World Stadiums

Athletics (track and field) venues in China
Sports venues in Shanghai
Venues of the 2008 Summer Olympics
Olympic football venues
Football venues in Shanghai
Multi-purpose stadiums in China
Rugby union stadiums in China
Xuhui District
Diamond League venues
Sports venues completed in 1999
1999 establishments in China